Amrutanjan Healthcare Limited is an Indian pharmaceutical company headquartered in Chennai, Tamil Nadu, India. It was founded by Kasinadhuni Nageswara Rao in Bombay (now Mumbai) in 1893.

History

Amrutanjan was established as a patent medicine business in Bombay (now Mumbai) in 1893 by K. Nageswara Rao Pantulu who was a journalist, social reformer and freedom fighter. The headquarters were shifted to Madras (now Chennai) in 1914.

As of 2014, it is headed by Sambhu Prasad, the grandson of Nageshwara Rao.

Products
Amrutanjan Healthcare's main product is its pain balm. In 2002, Amrutanjan Healthcare launched a series of anti-diabetic medicines called Diakyur.  In 2004, the company launched herbal mouth-fresheners under the brand name "Affair".

The Amrutanjan group also includes a software company called Amrutanjan Infotech. In July 2001, Amrutanjan Infotech's call-centre began its operations.

In May 2011 Amrutanjan diversified into foods, buying out Siva's Soft Drink Pvt Ltd, a Chennai-based company which sells fruit juices under the Fruitnik brand. It has relatively paid out 260 Million for the acquisition.

Amrutanjan balm

In 1936, Amrutanjan became a public limited company with the name Amrutanjan Limited. Kasinathuni Nageswara Rao popularised the balm by distributing it free-of-cost at music concerts.

On 13 November 2007, the company changed its name from Amrutanjan Limited to Amrutanjan Healthcare Limited and has ever since been known by that name.

On 4 July 2002, Amrutanjan Healthcare entered the U.S. market.

In 2022, the company launched a period pain roll-on under Comfy brand.

References

Bibliography

External links
 Amrutanjan Healthcare

Pharmaceutical companies established in 1893
Ayurvedic companies
Companies based in Chennai
Pharmaceutical companies of India
Health care companies of India
Indian brands
Indian companies established in 1893
1893 establishments in India